Bridgemary is a ward in Gosport, Hampshire, England. It is situated to the north of Gosport on the A32 towards Fareham. Every year there is a carnival organized by local residents. See -> Bridgemary Carnival

External links

Villages in Hampshire